Woyaya is the second album by Ghanaian Afro-rock band Osibisa released in 1971 by MCA. It was reissued in 2004 in a two-CD pack together with the self-titled album Osibisa by BGO Records.

Album title
Although conventionally spelled Woyaya the album's title is actually Wɔyaya (with an open-o), which comes from the Ghanaian Ga language of the Ga-Dangme people and translates as "We are going".

The title song was covered in 1973 by Art Garfunkel on his debut solo album Angel Clare and by the group The 5th Dimension on their 1973 album Living Together, Growing Together. "Woyaya" was also used as the signature tune for the popular Ghanaian television drama series Osofo Dadzie, which was broadcast between 1972 and 1981.

Track listing

Charts

Personnel
Osibisi
 Teddy Osei – tenor saxophone, flute, African drums, percussion, vocals
 Sol Amarfio – drums, fontomfrom, bongos, African drums, cowbells, percussion, vocals
 Mac Tontoh – trumpet, flugelhorn, cowhorn, kabasa, percussion, vocals
 Spartacus R (Roy Bedeau) – bass guitar, prempensua, assorted percussion
 Wendell Richardson – lead guitar, vocals
 Robert Bailey – organ, piano, timbales, percussion, vocals
 Loughty Lasisi Amao – tenor saxophone, baritone saxophone, flute, congas, fontomfrom
 Osibisa choir – friends and lovers

Production
 Producer – Tony Visconti
 Engineer – John Punter
 Recorded at Air Studios, London, England
 Cover illustration (and Osibisa logo) – Roger Dean
 Cover design - Roughedge

References

 All information from liner notes of CD Woyaya (Copyright © 1971 MCA Records).
 Allmusic Review by j. poet

External links
 
 Lisa G. Littlebird, "Woyaya", TheBirdSings.com

1971 albums
Osibisa albums
MCA Records albums
Albums produced by Tony Visconti
Albums with cover art by Roger Dean (artist)